Alessandro Motti and Stéphane Robert won the title, defeating Stephan Fransen and Wesley Koolhof 7–5, 7–5

Seeds

Draw

Draw

References
 Main Draw

Copa Sevilla doubles
Doubles
2013 ATP Challenger Tour